Indira Talwani (born October 6, 1960) is a judge on the United States District Court for the District of Massachusetts.

Biography

Talwani received a Bachelor of Arts degree, cum laude, in 1982, from Radcliffe College. She received a Juris Doctor in 1988 from UC Berkeley School of Law, graduating Order of the Coif. She began her legal career as a law clerk to Judge Stanley A. Weigel of the United States District Court for the Northern District of California, from 1988 to 1989. She served as an associate at the San Francisco, California, law firm of Altshuler Berzon LLP, from 1989 to 1995 and as a partner at that law firm, from 1996 to 1999. From 1999 to 2014, she served as a partner at the Boston, Massachusetts, law firm of Segal Roitman LLP, where she focused her practice on civil litigation at the State and Federal trial court and appellate levels.

Federal judicial service

On September 24, 2013, President Barack Obama nominated Talwani to serve as a United States District Judge of the United States District Court for the District of Massachusetts, to the seat vacated by Judge Mark L. Wolf, who assumed senior status on January 1, 2013. On February 6, 2014 her nomination was reported out of committee. Cloture was filed on her nomination on May 6, 2014. On Thursday May 8, 2014 the Senate voted on the motion to invoke cloture by a 55–41 vote. The Senate voted 94–0 for final confirmation later the same day. She received her judicial commission on May 12, 2014.

Judge Talwani presided over the sentencing of many parents involved in the Varsity Blues college admissions scandal, including actress Felicity Huffman. Talwani sentenced Huffman to 14 days in prison, 1 year supervised release, a $30,000 fine, and 250 hours of community service after Huffman pleaded guilty to conspiracy to commit mail fraud, and honest services mail fraud for her role in the scandal. Huffman served 11 out of her 14 days.

See also
List of Asian American jurists
List of first women lawyers and judges in Massachusetts

References

External links

1960 births
Living people
American jurists of Indian descent
California lawyers
Radcliffe College alumni
Judges of the United States District Court for the District of Massachusetts
Massachusetts lawyers
United States district court judges appointed by Barack Obama
21st-century American judges
UC Berkeley School of Law alumni